Qualification for archery at the 2020 Summer Paralympics begins on 1 June 2019 and ends on 1 July 2020.

Timeline

Quotas
Qualification slots are allocated to the NPC, not to an individual athlete. However, bipartite commissions are allocated to the athlete, not to the NPC.
 An NPC can enter a maximum of three eligible athletes per individual event.
 An NPC can enter a team of one male and female in the mixed team events.

Continental quotas
Men

Women

Mixed teams

The following teams are qualified in each of the mixed team events:

See also
Archery at the 2020 Summer Olympics – Qualification

References

Archery at the 2020 Summer Paralympics